The 2008 Race of Champions was the 21st running of the event, and took place on December 14, 2008 at Wembley Stadium, London. Two special races were due to take place during the event, the first of which, with Olympic gold medallist Chris Hoy cycling against the reigning Formula One World Champion Lewis Hamilton, who was due to be driving a Mercedes road car. However, due to the slippery track at Wembley, Hoy could not take part on the bicycle. Hamilton did demonstrate his championship-winning Vodafone McLaren Mercedes Formula One car at the event, his first major British public appearance since winning the F1 title. There was also a celebrity race, with eight celebrities taking part in Fiat 500 Abarth Assetto Corses. These celebrities were Hoy, boxers Frank Bruno, David Haye, Amir Khan and Enzo Maccarinelli, chef James Martin, footballer Bacary Sagna and singer Shayne Ward.

Participants

Cars
 Abarth 500 Assetto Corse
 Ford Focus RS WRC
 KTM X-Bow
 ROC Car
 RX Racing RX150
 Solution F Prototype

Driver's Cup

Final

Nations' Cup

Quarterfinals

Semifinals

Final

See also
Race of Champions

References

External links

 Official website of the Race of Champions

Race of Champions
Race of Champions
Race of Champions
International sports competitions in London